"Let's See Action" is a song written and composed by Pete Townshend and recorded by the Who. It was released as a single in the UK in 1971 and reached #16 in the charts.

Song notes
The song is the first of three non-album singles by the Who, that were intended for the aborted Lifehouse project. Pete Townshend's demo version, which appears on his first major label solo album Who Came First as "Nothing Is Everything (Let's See Action)", is longer than the version on the single and contains the additional lines, "Rumor has it minds are open. Then rumors fill them up with lies." The band's bassist, John Entwistle, said that the track was Pete Townshend "Trying to talk to the kids in general." According to The Who's biographer John Atkins, the song takes ideas from the teachings of Meher Baba, encompassing "Soul searching and the utilization of positive impulses from within."

B-side
The B-side of the single was "When I Was a Boy", which was written and sung by John Entwistle. According to John Atkins, this song is a lament about lost childhood and coping with adulthood that follows.

Charts and releases
The single was released in the UK on 15 October 1971. It reached #16 in the charts. "Let's See Action" was also released as a single in several other countries, but not in the U.S., where it remained unreleased until its inclusion on the Hooligans compilation album in 1981.
"Let's See Action" was also remixed by Jon Astley and Andy Macpherson for the 30 Years of Maximum R&B box set in 1994. "When I Was a Boy" was released on CD on Polydor's Rarities 1966–1972 Vol. 1 & 2, and MCA's Who's Missing. "Let's See Action" has since been included on the compilations My Generation: The Very Best of The Who and The Who Hits 50!.

Live performances
"Let's See Action" was performed at the Royal Albert Hall in 2000 with Eddie Vedder sharing lead vocals with Roger Daltrey. This performance later appeared on the live album Live at the Royal Albert Hall.

Personnel
 Roger Daltrey – lead vocals  (verses)
 Pete Townshend – guitar, synthesizer, lead vocals (bridge)
 John Entwistle – bass, horn
 Keith Moon – drums
 Nicky Hopkins – piano

References

The Who songs
1975 singles
1975 songs
Song recordings produced by Glyn Johns
Songs written by Pete Townshend
Track Records singles
Polydor Records singles